William Hugh Nurse (1832 – 23 May 1885) was a member of the New Zealand Legislative Council from 27 June 1868 to 23 May 1885, when he died aged 53.

He was from Southland.

References 

1832 births
1885 deaths
Members of the New Zealand Legislative Council
19th-century New Zealand politicians